The Synesthesia Mandala Drum is a patented electronic drum pad developed by Vince DeFranco and drummer Danny Carey from Tool. It has 128 strike position detection rings from its center to its edge, along with 127 levels of velocity sensitivity. In its current iteration, mk2.9, both values are transmitted via USB MIDI to a computer, where they can be interpreted by any MIDI software. The Mandala also includes its own "Virtual Brain" software. The current USB/software system replaces a hardware brain that the version 1.0 Mandala system had employed. The pad can be struck with drum sticks or fingers and hands.

Technology
The Mandala pad represents patented membrane sensor technology that was developed over several years by Vince DeFranco and was released to the public in May 2006. 

Because a Mandala surface is divided into 128 position rings and can detect 127 strike velocities (greater than 0) it can produce up to 16,256 (128 x 127) individual triggers. For practical playing the pad can be concentrically divided into as little as one or as many as six playing zones via its Virtual Brain software. The individual zones, position rings, and velocity levels can be used to trigger different instruments, effects parameters, or volume changes.

The newest version of the Mandala, mk2.9, is a standard class-compliant USB MIDI controller (no special drivers required) which uses a computer as its sound source. When the pad is struck it sends a MIDI trigger note with velocity as well as a position value (in the form of a MIDI continuous controller) across a USB cable into a computer. A Virtual Brain program is included with mk2.9 and has a set of included instrument samples and multiple effects (filters, delay, distortion, etc.) which can be applied to individual zones or to the overall surface. Unlimited user samples can also be added to the included sound library. Any parameter of any effect can be controlled by the position (0-127) or velocity (0-127) of a surface strike, resulting in effects such as bending pitch, changing delay time, or increasing reverb as the pad is played from center to edge. The position controller and velocity controller can be scaled to the player's liking. Factory preset sound configurations are included with the Virtual Brain as well as unlimited empty slots for user created presets. Drummers can also modify panning and note settings for each zone. The Virtual Brain program is not required to play the Mandala because the pad is a MIDI controller that can trigger any software that accepts MIDI input.

Mk2.9 demonstrates the resolution of its sensitivity by including a bonus of over 1500 position and velocity based samples of a single vintage snare drum which get laid out over the Mandala surface for an accurate playing representation.

Version 1.0 of the Mandala included a standalone hardware 'brain' with an onboard sound chip and effects. That version is no longer available.

External links 
Synesthesia Manufacturer website
Mandala YouTube Channel Demos and performances
Danny Carey Co-developer and user
Mandala Drum Forum User community

Endorsers  
Danny Carey Tool
Pat Mastelotto King Crimson
Will Calhoun Living Colour
Matt Chamberlain Pearl Jam/Bowie/Peter Gabriel/Tori Amos/Critters Buggin +
Igor Cavalera Sepultura/Cavalera Conspiracy/Mixhell +
Aaron Harris ISIS
Joe Barresi Producer, Engineer: The Melvins/Tool/Queens of the Stone Age/Weezer/Wolfmother +
Jaron Lanier Computer Scientist/Composer/Visual Artist/Author
Lol Tolhurst The Cure/Levinhurst

References 

Electronic musical instruments